The Sunset Lake Floating Bridge is a floating bridge that carries Vermont Route 65 across Sunset Lake in Brookfield, Vermont, United States.

History
The first bridge on this site was erected in 1820.  It was built this way because the lake is too deep for traditional pilings.

The seventh bridge was closed to traffic and torn down in 2008 for replacement due to failure of its flotation system, which was based on foam-filled barrels.

The current bridge, the eighth at this location, is supported by fiber-reinforced polymer pontoons.

References

External links
 

Road bridges in Vermont
Buildings and structures in Brookfield, Vermont
Pontoon bridges in the United States
Bridges completed in 1820
Bridges completed in 1884
Bridges completed in 1936
Bridges completed in 1978
Bridges completed in 2015
Bridges in Orange County, Vermont
1820 establishments in Vermont